The Alfa Romeo 6C name was used on road, race, and sports cars produced between 1927 and 1954 by Alfa Romeo; the "6C" name refers to the six cylinders of the car's straight-six engine. Bodies for these cars were made by coachbuilders such as James Young, Zagato, Touring Superleggera, Castagna, and Pinin Farina. Beginning in 1933 there was also a 6C version with an Alfa factory body, built in Portello. In the early 1920s Vittorio Jano received a commission to create a lightweight, high performance vehicle to replace the Giuseppe Merosi designed RL and RM models. The car was introduced in April 1925 at the Salone dell' Automobile di Milano as the 6C 1500. It was based on Alfa's P2 Grand Prix car, using a single overhead cam 1,487 cc in-line six-cylinder engine, producing 44 horsepower. In 1928 the 1500 Sport was presented, which was the first Alfa Romeo road car with double overhead camshafts.

6C 1500 (1927–1929)

In the mid-1920s, Alfa's RL was considered too large and heavy, so a new development began. The 2-litre formula that had led to Alfa Romeo winning the Automobile World Championship in 1925, changed to 1.5-litres for the 1926 season. The 6C 1500 was introduced in 1925 at the Milan Motor Show. Series production started in 1927, with the P2 Grand Prix car as a starting point. Engine capacity was now 1,487 cc, as against the P2's 1,987 cc, while supercharging was dropped. First versions were bodied by James Young and Carrozzeria Touring.

In 1928, the 6C Sport model was released, with a dual overhead-camshaft engine. Its sport version won many races, including the 1928 Mille Miglia. Total production was 3,000 (200 with DOHC engines). Ten examples of a supercharged (compressore, compressor) Super Sport variant were also built.

Specifications

Production

6C 1750 (1929–1933)

The more powerful 6C 1750 (1,752 cc actual) was introduced in 1929 in Rome. It was produced in six series between 1929 and 1933. The base model had a single overhead cam. Super Sport and Gran Sport versions had a double overhead cam engine (DOHC). Again, a supercharger was available. Most of the cars were sold as rolling chassis and bodied by coachbuilders such as Zagato, and Touring Superleggera. Additionally there were 3 examples built with James Young bodywork, one of which is a part of the permanent collection at the Simeone Foundation Automotive Museum in Philadelphia, PA, USA, in original and unrestored condition.

In 1929, the 6C won every major racing event in which it was entered, including the Grands Prix of Belgium, Spain, Tunis and Monza, and the Mille Miglia was won by Giuseppe Campari and Giulio Ramponi. The car also won the Brooklands Double Twelve and the Ulster TT. In 1930 the car again won the Mille Miglia and Spa 24 Hours. Total production was 2,635.

Gallery of models

6C 1750 GS Zagato/Aprile

The 1931 6C 1750 with license plate number "3710 SV" and chassis/engine number #10814331, which is currently owned by notorious rare car collector Corrado Lopresto, is a unique example, whose story is told in Lopresto's bilingual 2015 Skira book Best in Show – Capolavori dell'auto italiana dalla collezione Lopresto – Italian Cars Masterpieces from the Lopresto Collection.

The English-language section about this car tells:

A plush version of the car, manufactured by Vitale Barberis Canonico, was also given, together with the book, to some of Lopresto's friends.

Specifications

Production

6C 1900 (1933)

The Alfa Romeo 6C 1900 was the final derivative of the original 6C 1500, produced in 197 examples during 1933 as a transitional model, before the new 6C 2300 was introduced the following year.
Only built in Gran Turismo guise with a  wheelbase, the 6C 1900 replaced the corresponding 6C 1750 model. Besides the larger displacement, other notable mechanical changes were aluminium cylinder heads, an improved chassis frame and a new transmission. The same upgrades were applied to the 1933 model 6C 1750 Gran Sport which, together with the 6C 1900, form the sixth series of the 6C. Alfa Romeo offered the 6C 1900 with an in-house 4-door saloon body, while bespoke coachbuilt body styles included 4-seater cabriolets.

For the first time on a 6C the cylinder head was aluminium; some engines were also manufactured using an aluminium block with pressed-in steel sleeves in place of the usual cast iron block.
The improved chassis frame consisted of fully boxed rails and crossmembers, instead of the 1750's C-shaped sections. A new four-speed gearbox was fitted, with synchromesh on the two top gears and a freewheel mechanism.

Specifications

Production

6C 2300 (1934–1938)

The 6C 2300 (2,309 cc) was designed by Vittorio Jano as a lower-cost alternative to the 8C. In 1934 Alfa Romeo had become a state-owned enterprise. That year, a new 6C model with a newly designed and larger engine was presented. Chassis technology, however, had been taken from the predecessor.
One year later a revised model, the 6C 2300 B, was presented. In this version the engine was placed in a completely redesigned chassis, with independent front suspension and rear swing axle, as well as hydraulic brakes. 760 examples of the rigid-axle 6C 2300 were produced and 870 examples of the B-model.

Specifications

Gallery of models

Aerodinamica Spyder

The Alfa Romeo Aerodinamica Spyder was a one-off mid-engine streamlined prototype, built by brothers Gino and Oscar Jankovitz in connection with Alfa Romeo between 1935 and 1937 in Fiume (today Rijeka), and should have been powered by an Alfa Romeo 12-cylinder engine.
The construction of the car took many years, while technical changes had to be made due to the testing period from 1936 to 1937.
The Aerospyder represents:
 The first “modern” mid-engined sports car design.
 The first mid-engined car with central driving position (albeit Lancia deposited a patent for a centrally driven design in 1934).
 The first car designed to take account of newly developed principles of aerodynamics, to provide low drag both externally and internally.
 The first car which was designed for high speeds, by using a body which fully enveloped the underside of the car to reduce air turbulence beneath it and an aerodynamic front design to reduce front lift of the car

History
Between 1935 and 1937 the Jankovits carried out the construction; a "rolling chassis" could be registered in Fiume (number plate: 2757 FM) tested, and subsequently modified.

The No.700316 6C 2300 Tipo Turismo straight-six engine placed behind the driver was Alfa Romeo: 2,309 cc, iron block, light alloy head, chain-driven dual overhead camshafts, spur gears, wet sump lubrication.
The Jankovits fitted exhaust pipes of equal length and improved intake of air to reduce the pressure drop. Later the engine was upgraded with three dual Weber 36 D 04 carburettors, a configuration used on the 6C 2500 SS of 1939.
The transmission was the 4-speed gearbox from the 6C 2300, mounted with a Hardy disc behind the engine originally fitted, which they removed. A differential unit from a Lancia Lambda was later fitted instead. A unique pre-selector gear change system was also developed. The clutch was hydraulically assisted.

The ladder chassis was made by Alfa Romeo for the central-mounted engine, with straight rails from front to the rear end of the car; it was numbered 700316 in accordance with the engine number.
The final suspension was all-independent, with "silent bloc" bushes;
at the front it consisted of double wishbones, with a thick sheet steel (4 mm) upper wishbone, lever-arm  Houdaille shock absorber hydraulic dampers, longitudinal torsion bars, and lower location through a transverse leaf spring; at the rear it had swing axles and radius arms, with a transverse leaf spring and longitudinal torsion bars.

Steering was worm and sector with Hardy disc.
Brakes used a two-circuit hydraulic system (two fluid distributors and two master cylinders, one for the front and one for the rear), Lockheed-type duplex brakes with  drums all round. An equaliser was fitted, which could avoid overbraking by changing the distribution of braking force between the front and rear brakes during driving.
5.50–18 racing crossply tyres were mounted on Alfa Romeo 18-inch Rudge-type wire wheels.

The aerodynamic shape of the car was designed by Oscar Jankovits, probably inspired by contemporary aerodynamic theories such as Paul Jaray's, and built at the Jankovits' garage between 1935 and 1937. It was a barchetta with central driving position and fully integrated wings (pontoon styling). The bodyshell was streamlined to minimise turbulence in the air flow, fully enveloping the underbody and integrating door handles and lights.
A horizontally mounted radiator made it possible to design an exceptionally low front profile for a pre-war car.
Air inlets were positioned in zones of high air pressure, and hot air outlets from the engine and brakes in areas of low pressure.

During the Second World War the completed prototype remained hidden in the Jankovits' garage in Fiume. After the war the Jankovits, in need of money, had to sell their car to an Anglo-American officer.
On Christmas Eve 1946, with a temporary registration document, Gino Jankovits drove the Aerospyder through the closed border into Italy causing a border shootout. Then the Alfa disappeared for about 30 years until it was rediscovered in England. In 1978, well-known Alfa Romeo historian Luigi Fusi put the then-owner of the car in contact with the Jankovits, and tried to buy the car for the Alfa museum. The acquisition failed, but the prototype had been painted blue, and then green as this was the original colour. The car still has its original licence plate and registration documents.

6C 2500 (1938–1952)

Introduced in 1938, the 2500 (2,443 cc) was the final 6C road car. World War II was coming and car development was stopped, but a few hundred 6C 2500s were built from 1940 to 1945. Postwar, the first new Alfa model was the 1946 6C 2500 Freccia d'Oro (Golden Arrow), of which 680 were built until late 1951, with bodies by Alfa. The 2500 had an enlarged engine compared to the predecessor model; this Vittorio Jano designed dual overhead cam engine was available with either one or three Weber carburetors. The triple carburetor version was used in the top-of-the-range SS (Super Sport) version. Various coachbuilders built their own bodied versions of the 2500, but most bodywork was built by Touring Superleggera of Milan.

The Tipo 256 was a racing version of 2500 made in eight examples between 1939 and 1940 for the Mille Miglia and the Le Mans 24 Hours. It was made in Spider (convertible) and Berlinetta (coupe) Touring bodystyles.

The car was sold to wealthy customers like King Farouk, Alì Khan, Rita Hayworth, Tyrone Power, and Prince Rainier. One was also featured in The Godfather in 1972.

The 2500 was one of the most expensive cars available in its time. The final 6C was built in 1952 and the model was replaced by the 1900.

All 6C 2500 vehicles are catalogued, together with chassis specifications, known fate, technical and race data and first owners, in the Editoriale Domus book Alfa Romeo 6C 2500 (written by Angelo Tito Anselmi).

Specifications

6C 2500 Freccia d'Oro

The 6C 2500 Freccia d'Oro (Golden Arrow) was the first postwar Alfa Romeo. 680 were built until 1951, with bodies by Alfa. The car was a Berlina bodystyle with 5–6 seats based on the 2500 Sport.

6C 2500 Villa d'Este

The 6C 2500 Villa d'Este was introduced in 1949 as a Berlinetta with coachwork by Touring Superleggera of Milan. The Villa d'Este used the 6C 2500 Super Sport chassis with a 110 bhp six-cylinder, 2,443 cc engine. Alfa Romeo chose the name 'Villa d’Este' after this design won the Concorso d’Eleganza, which was held at the historic resort on Lake Como in northern Italy. The 'Villa d'Este' was Alfa's last handbuilt model, with only 36 examples being built (including 5 cabriolets). 6C 2500 production ended in 1952 (although a couple of racing examples were produced in 1953).

6C 2500 Coloniale

The 6C 2500 Coloniale was a staff car version of the third series 6C 2500. It was commissioned in 1938 by the Italian Ministry of Defence, for military use in the Italian colonies. Two prototypes of the 6C 2500 Coloniale were manufactured in 1939. One was shipped to Italian East Africa, where Giambattista Guidotti, winner of the 1937 Mille Miglia driving an Alfa Romeo 8C 2300 B, was instructed to conduct testing in the harsh operational conditions. The car was the first to be manufactured using technology developed by the renowned Carrozzeria Touring, the Superleggera. The car had two spare wheels, a fuel tank of 120 litres and four additional reserve tanks with a capacity of 70 litres of gasoline. In addition there was a locking differential, engaged from the dashboard by the driver. Regular production began in 1941 and the first batch of 150 vehicles was delivered between 1941 and 1942; production was then halted due to war events Total production amounted to 150 series cars plus two prototypes.

6C 2500 Sport Pinin Farina

The 6C 2500 Pinin Farina was manufactured during the Second World War until 1943, when Alfa Romeo manufacture was switched to the technical needs of the army. The vehicles of the 1943 build series had only their chassis and the transmission assembled on the factory production line; the bodywork and interior build being undertaken by the Italian design studio Pinin Farina.

Gallery of 6C 2500 models

6C 3000 (1948–1954)
In 1948 a first Alfa Romeo 6C 3000 prototype was built. It was a 5–6 passenger 4-door saloon car of the same class as the 6C 2500, but which could be built using more modern and economical manufacturing processes.

Like its predecessor, the three-litre engine had a cast iron block, an aluminium head with hemispherical combustion chambers, two valves per cylinder, angled 90° and timed by directly acting, chain driven dual overhead camshafts. Fed by a twin-choke carburettor, it developed , sent to the rear wheels through a 4-speed all-synchromesh gearbox with a column-mounted shifter as on the 6C 2500.
The all-independent suspension was of the double wishbone type with coil springs upfront, and trailing arm type with transverse torsion bars at the rear.

After three prototypes had been made between 1948 and 1949, the project was abandoned when market analysis and product planning suggested the development of a smaller four-cylinder car—the Alfa Romeo 1900.
Despite this, the 3-litre engine was developed for competition use and gave birth to a number sports racing cars during the first half of the 1950s: the 6C 3000 C50, 6C 3000 CM and 6C 3000 PR.

Specifications

6C 3000 C50
In 1950 a 6C 3000 engine from the prototypes was tuned for racing and installed in a 6C 2500 Competizione, which became the 6C 3000 C50.
This one-off racing car was entered at the 1950 Mille Miglia with number 740, driven by Sanesi and Bianchi; the car did not finish the race, as the two had to withdraw near Ferrara.

6C 3000 CM

In 1952 engine parts of the 6C 3000 were used again on the 6C 3000 CM—for Competizione Maggiorata or Competition Enlarged Displacement.

The powerplant comes from a project by Giuseppe Busso.

The chassis was a tube frame based around a centre backbone; suspension was by double wishbones and De Dion tube at the rear. Six examples were built: four coupés and two spiders, bodied by Carrozzeria Colli.

Competition history
A coupé was driven by Juan Manuel Fangio and Giulio Sala to a second overall finish at the 1953 Mille Miglia. For the Mille Miglia the engine had been tuned to put out . Fangio was leading the race, but a problem with the steering forced him to slow down.
Again with Fangio at the wheel, a spider won the 1st Gran Premio Supercortemaggiore held in Merano in 1953.

Fate

With the end of its racing career, the 1953 Supercortemaggiore winner 6C 3000 CM spider was used by the Experimemtal Department of Alfa Romeo for testing new components. Amongst them were disc brakes, installed in 1955, which are still present today on this vehicle, part of the Museo Storico Alfa Romeo collection.

The ex-1953 Mille Miglia coupé was given to Pinin Farina, and rebodied four times into four different show cars to Aldo Brovarone's design:
 1956: Alfa Romeo Superflow. Shown at the 1956 Turin Motor Show, coupé body with plexiglas front wings and tail fins.
 1956: Alfa Romeo Superflow II. Shown at the 1956 Paris Motor Show, coupé body with steel wings and tail fins.
 1959: Alfa Romeo Spider Super Sport. Shown at the 1959 Geneva Motor Show, roadster body without tail fins.
 1960: Alfa Romeo Superflow IV. Shown at the 1960 Geneva Motor Show, coupé body without tail fins. The car survives today in this last configuration.

6C 3000 PR
 One of the two 6C 3000 CM spiders was modified to cope with the new rules of the International Sport Category, enacted in the 1954 season, which limited engine capacity to 3 litres. The 3000 CM's 3.5-litre straight-six was de-stroked to 2,943 cc.
The 6C 3000 PR was entered at the 2nd Gran Premio Supercortemaggiore held at Monza in 1954, driven by Sanesi; the vehicle was written off in a crash, in which Sanesi was also injured. It was resurrected from a museum in Brazil in the mid-1980s.

References

Bibliography

External links

Registro Internazionale Alfa Romeo 6C 2500
All Alfa Romeo 6C models chronologically listed

6C
6C
Grand Prix cars
1930s cars
1940s cars
1950s cars
Cars introduced in 1925
Cars introduced in 1929
Cars introduced in 1933
Cars introduced in 1934
Cars introduced in 1938
Rear-wheel-drive vehicles
Sedans
Coupés
Roadsters
24 Hours of Le Mans race cars
Mille Miglia
Streamline Moderne cars
Winner